Paul Dedecker (Brussels, 1921 – Caracas, 2007) was a Belgian mathematician who worked primarily in topology on the subjects of nonabelian cohomology, general category theory, variational calculus and its relations to homological algebra, exterior calculus on manifolds and mathematical physics.

He graduated in mathematics in 1948 at the Free University of Brussels, where he was a student of van den Dungen.

Works 
 Paul Dedecker, "Extension du groupe structural d'un espace fibré", Colloque de Topogie de Strasbourg (1955).
 Paul Dedecker, Variétés différentiables et espaces fibrés, Université de Liège, Liège : 1962.
 Paul Dedecker, "Sur la cohomologie non Abelienne, II", Canadian Journal of Mathematics, Vol. 15, No. 1 (1963), pp. 84–92.
 Paul Dedecker, Calcul des variations, formes différentielles et champs géodésiques, colloque international de géométrie différentielle, Strasbourg, CNRS : 1953.
 Paul Dedecker and Pierre Tison, Cours de topologie algébrique, fascicule 1, Caracas-Bruxelles-Lille : 1970.
 Paul Dedecker and Antoine Philippe, Cours de topologie algébrique, fascicule 2, Lille-Louvain-Santiage du Chili : 1970.

External links

Théorie algébrique des équations approchées, bulletin de l'Institut de Mathématiques de l'Université de Liège, 1955
Paul Dedecker, représentant de l'université de Liège à la réunion internationale de Mathématiques à Rochester (États-Unis) en 1957
"Une propriété des formes différentielles dans le calcul des variations", Pacific Journal of Mathematics, 1957
Catalogue de la bibliothèque centrale de l'université de Caracas, Venezuela
Pourprix Marie-Thérèse, Des mathématiciens à la faculté des sciences de Lille: 1854–1971, éditions L'Harmattan, Paris : 2009

1921 births
2007 deaths
20th-century Belgian mathematicians
Free University of Brussels (1834–1969) alumni